Charles Steadman (1790-1868) was an architect and builder in Princeton, New Jersey noted for his churches, university buildings, and especially private homes.  He left a significant legacy of Greek Revival buildings at Princeton University, Princeton Theological Seminary, and in the surrounding town.  He has been credited with "transform(ing) Princeton from a brick and stone village into a New-England-style town of wood and classical influences."

Gallery

References

External links

A collection of articles on Steadman

1790 births
1868 deaths
People from Princeton, New Jersey
Princeton University people
Architects from New Jersey